Johnson Bayou is a small unincorporated community  located on the Creole Nature Trail along the Gulf Coast in Cameron Parish, Louisiana, United States, and is named after Daniel Johnson, who came to the area circa 1790. The village is a barrier island spread across coastal chenieres which were formed by deltaic sedimentation by the shifting of the Mississippi River. This geologic formation, the coastal cheniere , is found only in a few locations across the globe. The population of the community was approximately 400 before Hurricanes Laura and Delta devastated the community in August and October of 2020. By September of 2021 the population had recovered to almost 300.

Johnson Bayou is part of the Lake Charles Metropolitan Statistical Area.

History
On October 12, 1886, Johnson Bayou was completely destroyed by the "great storm of 1886;" a storm surge of between seven and twelve feet that swept inland at Johnson Bayou, killing between 50 and 100 people. Between Sabine Pass and Beaumont, thirty miles of track of the Sabine and East Texas Railway, were damaged badly and partly washed away.

Johnson Bayou was hit again by Hurricane Audrey in 1957, and yet again by Hurricane Rita on September 24, 2005. On September 13, 2007, Hurricane Humberto made landfall west of Johnson Bayou at High Island, Texas, bringing heavy rains to the community.  On September 13, 2008, Hurricane Ike made landfall on the upper Texas coast, causing extensive damage to the region (NOAA).

In 2020, Johnson Bayou was struck by two hurricanes: Hurricane Laura on August 27, 2020 and Hurricane Delta on October 6, 2020.

Geography
Location: 29.7613323 -93.6584918 (29°45'40"N 93°39'30"W). Elevation: 5 to 7 feet (2 m).

Culture
The Holleyman Bird Sanctuary/Peveto Woods Bird and Butterfly Sanctuary is located in the community, and is south of the Sabine National Wildlife Refuge. Johnson Bayou is home to four natural gas pipelines, and the home of one of the largest LNG Terminals in the world. This LNG regasification terminal is being built by Cheniere Energy. https://web.archive.org/web/20071215224830/http://www.cheniere.com/default.shtml

Education
Cameron Parish School Board operates Johnson Bayou High School, a combined primary and secondary school serving the area.

Cameron Parish Public Library operated the Johnson Branch at 4586 Gulf Beach Highway in the area until the Mandatory Evacuation for Hurricane Laura in August on 2020. Currently the library expects to reopen in January of 2022.

Gallery

See also
1886 Atlantic hurricane season

References
Galveston Daily News, October 14–23, 1886.

Unincorporated communities in Cameron Parish, Louisiana
Unincorporated communities in Lake Charles metropolitan area
Unincorporated communities in Louisiana
Populated coastal places in Louisiana